Live at the BBC is a live album by American singer-songwriter Bobbie Gentry. It was released on April 21, 2018, by Capitol Records and Universal Music Catalogue for Record Store Day 2018. The album features recordings from the first two seasons of Gentry's BBC television series, Bobbie Gentry.

As a Record Store Day exclusive, the album was limited to 1,200 copies. In Europe the LP featured a download code for a digital copy of the album.

The tracks featured on this album are included on the 2018 compilation, The Girl from Chickasaw County: The Complete Capitol Masters, along with 14 additional recordings from all three seasons of the television series.

Track listing

Personnel
Adapted from the album liner notes.
Andrew Batt – compiler, sleeve notes
John Cameron – music director, piano
Tony Carr – drums, percussion
Stanley Dorfman – director, producer
Herbie Flowers – bass
Bobbie Gentry – lead vocals, acoustic guitar, piano
Tony Lyons – artwork
Colin Green – electric guitar
Pat Halling – strings conductor
Kris Maher – product manager
Harold McNair – flute, saxophone
Alan Parker – electric guitar
Tears of Joy – backing vocals
Danny Thompson – bass

References

2018 albums
Bobbie Gentry albums